Mattia Lombardo (born 14 February 1995) is an Italian footballer who plays as a midfielder for  club Torres. He is the son of former Italy international Attilio Lombardo.

Club career
Lombardo made his professional debut with Sampdoria on 13 April 2014 in the Serie A. He substituted Angelo Palombo after 84 minutes in a 0–4 home defeat against Inter Milan.

On 18 July 2014, he was signed by Cremonese. On 2 February 2015, he was signed by Pontedera.

Lombardo was released by Sampdoria on 1 July 2015.

In July 2015 he moved to Pro Vercelli; in February 2016 he was transferred to Mantova. Ahead of the 2016–17 season he joined Reggiana.

On 24 October 2019 he signed with Siena until 30 June 2020 with a renewal option.

On 7 October 2020, he joined Monopoli on a one-year contract.

On 1 February 2021, he moved to Sambenedettese on a 1.5-year contract.

On 22 October 2021, he signed with Teramo.

References

External links
 
 

1995 births
Living people
Footballers from Genoa
Italian footballers
Association football midfielders
Serie A players
Serie C players
U.C. Sampdoria players
U.S. Cremonese players
U.S. Città di Pontedera players
F.C. Pro Vercelli 1892 players
Mantova 1911 players
A.C. Reggiana 1919 players
S.S.D. Lucchese 1905 players
A.C.N. Siena 1904 players
S.S. Monopoli 1966 players
A.S. Sambenedettese players
S.S. Teramo Calcio players
S.E.F. Torres 1903 players